Ricky Istvan Soos (born 28 June 1983 in Mansfield, Nottinghamshire) is a retired English middle-distance runner who specialised in the 800 metres. He represented his country at the 2004 Summer Olympics, reaching the semifinals.

His personal best in the event is 1:45.70, set in 2004.

He is the husband of Lisa Dobriskey, also a runner.

Competition record

References

1983 births
Living people
English male middle-distance runners
Sportspeople from Mansfield
Athletes (track and field) at the 2004 Summer Olympics
Olympic athletes of Great Britain